DNA replication complex GINS protein PSF2 is a protein that in humans is encoded by the GINS2 gene.

Interactions 

GINS2 has been shown to interact with CHEK2.

References

Further reading